The Black Mountain Lookout Cabin in Gila National Forest in or near Black Mountain, New Mexico, was built in 1925.  It was listed on the National Register of Historic Places in 1988.

Black Mountain, Catron County, New Mexico

It is located on Black Mountain (Catron County, New Mexico)

Pics only

References

Buildings and structures on the National Register of Historic Places in New Mexico
National Register of Historic Places in Catron County, New Mexico
Log buildings and structures on the National Register of Historic Places in New Mexico
Fire lookout towers on the National Register of Historic Places in New Mexico
Buildings and structures completed in 1925